World of Kids is a 1951 American short documentary film directed by Robert Youngson. In 1952, it won an Oscar for Best Short Subject (One-Reel) at the 24th Academy Awards.

References

External links 
 

1951 films
1951 short films
1951 documentary films
American short documentary films
American black-and-white films
Live Action Short Film Academy Award winners
Warner Bros. short films
Documentary films about children
1950s short documentary films
1950s English-language films
1950s American films